The Bode is a small  long river in Thuringia, Germany.

The Bode is a left tributary of the Wipper. Its source is near the village of Holungen in a small upland range called the Ohm Hills. From there the Bode flows in a southeastern direction until it joins the Wipper at Bleicherode.

See also
List of rivers of Thuringia

References 

ADFC-Radtourenkarte – Harz/Leinetal. Bielefelder Verlagsanstalt,  (German map)

Rivers of Thuringia
Rivers of Germany